Robert the Doll is an allegedly haunted doll exhibited at the East Martello Museum in Key West, Florida. Robert was once owned by painter, author, and Key West resident Robert Eugene Otto.

History 
The doll originally belonged to Robert Eugene Otto, an artist described as "eccentric", who belonged to a prominent Key West family. The doll was reportedly manufactured by the Steiff Company of Germany, purchased by Otto's grandfather while on a trip to Germany in 1904, and given to young Otto as a birthday gift. The doll's sailor suit was likely an outfit that Otto wore as a child.

The doll remained stored in the Otto family home at 534 Eaton Street in Key West while Otto studied art in New York and Paris. Otto married Annette Parker in Paris on May3, 1930. The couple returned to the Otto family home in Key West to live there until Otto died in 1974. His wife died two years later. After their deaths, the Eaton Street home containing the doll was sold to Myrtle Reuter, who owned it for 20 years until the property was sold to the current owners, who operate it as a guest house.

In 1994, the doll was donated to the East Martello Museum in Key West, Florida, where it became a popular tourist attraction. It is annually rotated to the Old Post Office and Customhouse in October.

Legend
According to legend, the doll has supernatural abilities that allow it to move, change its facial expressions, and make giggling sounds. Some versions of the legend claim that a young girl of "Bahamian descent" gave Otto the doll as a gift or as "retaliation for a wrongdoing". Other stories claim that the doll moved voodoo figurines around the room, and was "aware of what went on around him". Still other legends claim that the doll "vanished" after Otto's house changed ownership a number of times after his death, or that young Otto triggered the doll's supernatural powers by blaming his childhood mishaps on the doll. According to local folklore, the doll has caused "car accidents, broken bones, job loss, divorce and a cornucopia of other misfortunes", and museum visitors supposedly experience "post-visit misfortunes" for "failing to respect Robert".

In popular culture 
The doll was exhibited at TapsCON, a convention hosted by The Atlantic Paranormal Society held in Clearwater, Florida, in May 2008, marking the first time that it had left Key West, Florida, in its then-104 years of existence.
In October 2015, the doll was taken to Las Vegas for a Travel Channel television program in Zak Bagans's "Haunted Museum." The episode originally aired on April2, 2016, as the first episode of Deadly Possessions, and re-aired on August12, 2017, as the first episode of the series Ghost Adventures: Artifacts.
A horror film franchise loosely based on the legend began with the film Robert, released in 2015. To date, four sequels have followed: The Curse of Robert the Doll in 2016, The Toymaker in 2017, The Revenge of Robert the Doll in 2018, and Robert Reborn in 2019.
The doll and a replica doll sold at the gift shop at the Martello museum appeared in the second season of Ozzy & Jack's World Detour.
The doll was featured in an episode of the podcast and TV series Lore.

See also 
 Annabelle (doll)

References

External links 
 Robert The Doll website, hosted by the Key West Art and Historical Society
The Key West Art & Historical Society's dedicated page for Robert the doll

1904 introductions
1900s toys
American legends
Florida folklore
Tourist attractions in Key West, Florida
Haunted dolls
Supernatural legends
Urban legends
Creepypasta